Lexicon Tetraglosson,, was a dictionary of four languages as part of the Εισαγωγική Διδασκαλία (Romanised: Eisagogiki Didaskalia) created by Daniel Moscopolites a Aromanian scholar from Moscopole.

Dictionary

Daniel, created the Εισαγωγική Διδασκαλία ("Introductory Instruction") and compiled a combined dictionary of Greek (Romaika), Aromanian (Vlachika), Bulgarian (Vulgarika) and Albanian (Alvanitika) to motivate non-Greek speakers with this dictionary to learn the Greek language:

The book was printed in 1794 in Venice. The Albanian, Aromanian and Bulgarian translations were written in the Greek alphabet. The Bulgarian part of the dictionary is regarded as the earliest dictionary of Bulgarian. Modern Macedonian authors see the Bulgarian part of the dictionary as the Macedonian language. This part was provided and translated by Pop Stefan, an 18th-century sakellarios living in the city of Ohrid who was a friend of Daniel and of Aromanian descent as well. Pop Stefan is the progenitor of the current notable Ohrid family Pop Stefanija who reside in that city to this day.

By looking at the correspondence between Pop Stefan and Daniel Moscopolites, it is known that they were close friends and that Pop Stefan translated the text.

Daniel's first letter is dated April 13, 1793. The printing of the Lexicon Tetraglosson took place the following year. Here is what the letter says:

Who Dimitrius is, is learned from the second letter dated April 30, 1793:

His full name was Dimitrius of Ioannou from Moscopole. By the correspondence it is known that Dimitrius was a student in Ohrid under the wing of Pop Stefania. Afterwards he went to Magarevo and became a priest there.

It is known that Pop Stefan was so fond of his pupil that hen welcomed him into his family and Dimitrius married Pop Stefan's granddaughter of his oldest son, Nikola Pop Stefania. They had a daughter together. Her name was Sultana and she was the mother of Dimitar and Konstantin, the famous Miladinov brothers who were poets and activists from Struga.

Pop Stefan and Daniel Moscopolites remained good friends. He said about the Sakellarios that "his golden mouth gathered what the muses gave". They met on the market of Struga where Daniel, later in life, lived until his death in 1825.

The Lexicon was reprinted in Bulgaria in 1841.

Notes

References

External links
 Εισαγωγική Διδασκαλία (Introductory instruction), 1802

Aromanian academics
1794 non-fiction books